= Cuban neuropathy =

An epidemic of optic and peripheral neuropathy occurred in Cuba during 1991–1994. According to a preliminary summary from the Ministry of Public Health of Cuba (MINSAP), there were 50,862 cases out of a population of 10.8 million. The etiology is likely nutritional deficiencies, particularly thiamine, compounded by toxic effects of alcohol and tobacco use.

This marked a period of acute food shortage and changes in the Cuban basic diet where studies were done resulting in inconclusive hypothesis, example: the wide introduction of products based on unfermented soy beans affecting vitamin absorption.

== Sources ==
Macias-Matos C, Rodriguez-Ojea A, Chi N, Jimenez S, Zulueta D, Bates CJ. Biochemical evidence of thiamine depletion during the Cuban neuropathy epidemic, 1992–1993. Am J Clin Nutr. 1996 Sep;64(3):347-53.
